Miltochrista ziczac is a moth of the family Erebidae. It was described by Francis Walker in 1856. It is found in China.

References

 

ziczac
Moths described in 1856
Moths of Asia